The Lute Olson Award is an award given annually to the most outstanding men's college basketball player in NCAA Division I competition. The award was established in 2010 and is named for former Arizona Wildcats head coach Lute Olson.

Selection
Through the 2020–21 season, only players who had completed at least two seasons at their current school were eligible for the award. As such, freshmen and first-year transfers were not eligible. Starting with the 2021–22 season, eligibility was extended to all D-I players regardless of their academic class or tenure at a school. The recipient is chosen by a committee including current and former coaches, NBA players, media members, and others involved in the basketball community. Lute Olson also served on the committee until his death in 2020.

Winners

Winners by school

References
General

Specific

External links
Official site

Awards established in 2010
College basketball trophies and awards in the United States